Ashvin Kumar is India's youngest Oscar-nominated and two-time national award-winning filmmaker, who has written, directed and produced a wide range of films, including India's only Oscar nominated short film Little Terrorist (2004), documentary Inshallah, Kashmir (2012) and Inshallah Football (2010); feature-length thriller The Forest (2012); coming-of-age tale Dazed in Doon (2010) and his debut film Road to Ladakh (2004) starring Irrfan Khan.

In 2005, he became the youngest Indian writer/director with an Academy Award Oscar nomination, Ashvin is also the first Indian to be nominated at the European Film Academy with his film Little Terrorist which has been part of official selections to over 130 film festivals, winning awards in 25 of them, including the British Academy of Film and Television (BAFTA) LA.

Ashvin faced a roadblock with Indian censors for his film No Fathers in Kashmir which initially received an 'A' certificate. He wrote an open letter to Prasoon Joshi, the director of CBFC, as well as appealed to the FCAT. The film got released with a U/A certificate on 5 April 2019.

Background 

Ashvin Kumar was born in Kolkata, India and is well-known fashion designer, Ritu Kumar's son. He did his schooling from La Martiniere Kolkata, Modern School and The Doon School, Dehradun. He describes his experience as a student at Doon as "overall pretty miserable". He went on to study at St. Stephen's College, New Delhi, where he was an active member of the renowned Shakespeare Society and then at Goldsmith's University, London, where he received a bachelor's degree in media and communication and briefly, at the London Film School. He has described himself as a "resounding dropout" and of his experience at film school he says, "The institutionalization of cinema was suffocating. I wanted to learn on the job. I wanted to be adventurous." The lack of opportunities to make short films led him to move from New Delhi to London.

Films

No Fathers in Kashmir

No Fathers in Kashmir, previously Noor, is a story of hope and forgiveness told through the eyes of two teenagers experiencing first-love and heart break. It is a coming-of-age narrative of innocence and tenderness set in Kashmir . The screenplay of Noor was one of eight projects selected to Sundance Institute / Mumbai Mantra Lab 2014. The script was also awarded a development grant by Asia Pacific Screen Academy.

In February 2016, Noor's Kickstarter campaign raised £74,000 ($100,000).  The Kickstarter platform provided funding for the film without being held to anyone else's agendas, or having to compromise the creative vision of the script.  To support the crowdfunding campaign, Ashvin traveled across the UK to visit Kashmiri communities in London, Glasgow, Manchester, Rochdale, Bradford and Birmingham and held free screenings of his films, Inshallah, Kashmir and Inshallah, Football.

Currently, the film has hit a roadblock with Indian Censors that have awarded the film an 'A' certificate. Kumar has written an open letter to Prasoon Joshi and has appealed to the Film Certification Appellate Tribunal (FCAT).

Road to Ladakh 

Kumar's first film was Road to Ladakh, which took 9 months to make, although the actual filming was done in 16 days. The film is 48 minutes long, and was released in 2004.  Kumar has described this film as his "film school", referring to him dropping out of the London Film School and investing the course fees into the making of this film. Kumar learnt production and post production by immersing himself into various roles and learning the craft on-the-fly while putting his own film through the many stages of production. He describes it as a process of trial and error from which he emerged with a completed film. For starters, "Road to Ladakh was a disaster of a film shoot, we were lucky to get the film done" "Out of a ten-day shoot, it was raining on five days. So, we had to finish the shoot in half the time. There was just one petrol pump (in Spiti valley where the film was shot) – we had seven cars and two trucks and a cast and crew of 40 people (who were staying in camping tents that later got flooded) looking at me for directions at every step. There I was – my first film, in Ladakh, and I thought to myself – what the hell have I got myself into?" The experiences of this shoot are captured in the making-of documentary The Near Un-making of Road To Ladakh which accompanies the film on a DVD released for the first time in India in 2009 through Junglee Video (the DVD label of Times Music) in a double bill with Little Terrorist. The DVD also contains an entertaining and informative making-of documentary of Little Terrorist and is available at music and DVD shops all over India. Says the Mid-Day newspaper review "an elaborate tease that takes you into the minds of two lonely people who can scarce afford to trust each other. One's an enigma while the other snorts coke like it was a meal."

Plot summary 

Starring Irrfan Khan, known for his roles in The Warrior, Slumdog Millionaire, A Mighty Heart, The Namesake, The Amazing Spider-Man and Life of Pi and Koel Purie from Everybody Says I'm Fine!, Road to Ladakh follows the surreal rites of passage encounter between a dysfunctional, coke-snorting fashion model and an ultra-focussed, strong-silent stranger who are thrown together by chance. Set in the magnificent wilderness moonscape of Ladakh, India, the road journey and the strange encounters that follow provide a dramatic backdrop for the relationship that develops between the two. Both are outsiders, both are lonely and both crave the human contact that their roles in society deny them.

The film, written, directed, edited and produced by Kumar, is poised between elusiveness and engagement, suspicion and tenderness – at once hilarious and sinister, bizarre and moving, psychedelic and intensely real. A road-movie that drew the talents of a multi-national European crew whose overly ambitious Himalayan adventure was so fraught with disasters that it nearly failed.

Road To Ladakh is a suspenseful tale of falling in love with the wrong kind of mysterious stranger near the borders of India and Pakistan. A road-movie that drew the talents of a multi-national European crew on an overly ambitious Himalayan adventure so fraught with disasters that it nearly didn't get finished; as documented in The Near Un-making of Road To Ladakh.

Little Terrorist 

His second film, Little Terrorist (2005), was substantially more successful, winning an Oscar nomination, a nomination for the European Film Awards as well top prizes at the Tehran International Short Film Festival, Flanders International Film Festival, Montreal World Film Festival, Manhattan International Short Film Festival and the São Paulo International Short Film Festival. The film has been invited to over 120 film festivals around the world. This film was shot in the tight budget in the deserts of Rajasthan.

Plot summary 

The film was based upon a real-life incident in the year 2000 where a young goatherd crossed the Indian-Pakistan border and was subsequently imprisoned by the Indian police. Sri Atal Bihari Vajpayee, the then Prime Minister of India, freed the boy as a peace gesture intended to improve Indian-Pakistan relations.

In the film, a 12-year-old Pakistani boy named Jamal mistakenly crosses the border into Indian territory while attempting to retrieve a cricket ball. While Indian soldiers search the village for the Pakistani "terrorist", the boy is given shelter by an elderly Brahmin schoolteacher named Bhola, despite the latter's deep-rooted prejudice against Muslims, and the objections of Bhola's niece, Rani .

The story is set near the Gujarat border between India and Pakistan, but the film was made in five days in a village outside Jaipur in Rajasthan.  Kumar's mother, the fashion designer Ritu Kumar, designed the clothes for the actors.

The film is a "live action short", just 15 minutes in length.  It has been described as the first short film to get a commercial release in India.

Film-making and awards 

The film was crewed through the Shooting People organisation; members who liked the script paid their own fares to travel to India to film it. Kumar became the only Indian to be nominated for an Oscar in the short film category.

The Forest 

The Forest was loosely based upon the writings and exploits of Jim Corbett and uses the tale of a man-eating leopard to address environmental concerns. The film is feature-length (86 minutes), and was released in theatres in India on 11 May 2012.

The plot concerns a married couple who arrive at a wildlife sanctuary in the Kumaon Hills to attempt to mend a faltering marriage.  An unforeseen threat takes the form of an ex-lover turned wildlife warden.  While the husband and lover quarrel, a man-eating leopard is on the prowl, and both men must unite in order to outwit the predator and survive the night.

While The Forest is a conventional action film, Kumar intended the film to convey a strong pro-environmental message.

The film was produced by Judith James and the music recorded at the Abbey Road Studios.  Much of the filming was done at the Corbett National Park and the Bandhavgarh National Park.  The film stars Jaaved Jaaferi, Nandana Sen and Ankur Vikal.

The Magic of Cinema on the full display. The forest wildlife sequences is filmed by world-renowned Bedi Brothers, Naresh Bedi & Rajesh Bedi (First Indian to win Green Oscar in 1984 and only Indian to have won two BAFTA, British Academy of Film and Television Arts Nomination for two tigers films- Saving the Tigers & Man Eating Tiger), Additional Cinematographer & Sound is done by Naresh's twin son Vijay Bedi & Ajay Bedi (Youngest Indian to win Green Oscar in 2004 and only Indian to win Nomination for "Craft Category of Editing"  at 28th Annual News and Documentary EMMY awards, New York, USA, 2007).

Dazed in Doon 

Kumar himself an old boy of The Doon School was invited by The Doon School to create a film, subsequently named Dazed in Doon, that has since become controversial as the School authorities have moved to suppress the distribution of the film, on the grounds that it "doesn't give the School a good name". The film runs to 55 minutes and was made in just four months, from the start of pre-production on 20 June 2010 to the first screening on 23 October 2010.

An international crew contributed to the making of the film: post-production was completed in Goa (editing), Italy (picture color correction) and London (sound mixing) with Kumar simultaneously completing post-production on Inshallah, Football . Most crew members worked for a fraction of their usual fees: Kumar persuaded them to participate in the making of film by highlighting the opportunity of teaching young children film-making in a participatory film project that would result in film of their own. Kumar sings the Doon School song 'Lap Pe Aati Hai'  in the soundtrack as well as Howly is Krishna which was improvised during a music recording session in Goa.

Making of Dazed in Doon 

Imaginox an 'online film school' were the sponsors of the video 'making of Dazed in Doon'. Two British film makers were sent by Imaginox from the UK to join Kumar's crew on The Doon School campus where they, simultaneously with Kumar's filming, shot a behind- the-scenes documentary film which can be viewed on www.imaginox.com

Plot summary 

The film is a coming of age story about a boy nicknamed "Howly"(Sookrit Malik) with an active imagination who is trying to make sense of life at The Doon School, a prestigious public school located in Dehra Dun in India.

Howly's friend, nicknamed "Boozy"(Aseem Kumar), is an excellent sportsman who is about to win the most coveted award for sports at Doon: the "games blazer". Seeing his friend's determination to win, Howly cheats on Boozy's behalf at a high jump qualifier, giving him the points Boozy needs to win the games blazer.

Despite Howly's loyalty and hero-worship of Boozy, Boozy refuses to associate with Howly in front of others, effectively relegating Howly to the role of a sidekick.  After a particularly bad bullying episode that is witnessed by a School master, Howly is encouraged to audition for a part in the theatrical version of the Mahabharata.  Howly discovers a natural talent for acting, and is cast in the lead role of the god Krishna.

Thereafter, the mythic world of the Mahabharata, with the philosophical and ethical choices forced upon its characters, merges with Howly's own real-life dilemmas: Boozy discovers that Howly had cheated on his behalf, and that his games blazer had been won unfairly.

Kumar attempted to demonstrate a number of positive qualities that he believed Doon instilled in its pupils: a sense of values, ethics, friendship, loyalty, the ability to correct moral choices, and to form independent judgments and decisions. The storyline of the film uses a classic text of ethics (the Mahabharata) to link the growing pains of a schoolboy with the subtleties of Dharma, as outlined in classical Indian philosophy, by linking these concepts to the ethical choices that the characters have to make in their day-to-day lives.

Participatory educational project 

Kumar and his crew spent several months on the campus making the film in a consultative and participatory process that included both teachers and students.  The film was shot over 25 days, and included a cast and crew of 40 boys and more than 500 extras.  As a consequence of dealing with these logistics, which included training a large number of young boys as actors and crew-members and dealing with a heavy monsoon that upset the shooting schedule, Kumar improvised some of the acting and settings of the film, yet keeping to the original story and script. It is perhaps the first time in India that a near feature-length film of this nature has been made with school boys taking key roles both behind and in front of the camera.

Censorship controversy 

The present controversy between Kumar and the School authorities has the School complaining that the film does not conform with a version alleged to have been shown to the Headmaster before its presentation at the School, and Kumar asserting that the School should have asked for changes at the time the script was being drafted in close consultation with the School's representative, Ratna Pathak Shah, over a period of six months, since January 2010. The script had been submitted and approved, and funding was approved before shooting commenced.

As a consequence of this controversy, the School authorities have obtained an injunction from the district court in Dehra Dun to stop the film's release, and the dispute between director and School continues unabated.

The Headmaster of the Doon School asked the Ministry of Information and Broadcasting's censor board to withhold a censor certificate for the film on the grounds that the film is defamatory. The censor board upheld the Headmaster's concerns and awarded the film a U/A certificate, asking Kumar to produce a "no objection certificate" from the School.

Further complicating the dispute is the question of ownership of the film: the School asserts that it owns the film; Kumar asserts that the School is contracted to become one of three copyright holders, once the terms of the contract between Kumar and the School have been fulfilled.  Kumar asserts, further, that since the School has not yet paid him in full under the terms of his contract, they cannot yet claim their one-third share of the copyright.

The dispute has polarized the alumni community of the School (known popularly as Doscos, with the more conservative alumni expressing concern about the School's reputation getting damaged as a result of the film depiction of bullying, etc., and the more liberal alumni expressing concern that the attempt to censor an artist's output is not in keeping with Doon's founding traditions or ethos.

The film was originally shown to about 3,000 people who attended Doon's 75th Anniversary celebrations in October 2010.

Release of Dazed in Doon online 

On 17 July 2013, The Doon School Confessions page on Facebook posted a link to a Pastebin page where there are links to stream or download the film online.

Inshallah, football 

Kumar's first documentary film, the National Award winner  Inshallah, football www.inshallahfootball.com, is a feature documentary about an aspiring footballer who was denied the right to travel abroad on the pretext that father was a militant in the 1990s.  The film was completed in 2010, and has faced difficulties getting released in India. The film's first screening in India at the India Habitat Center received this review from Tehelka magazine, 'Kumar's camera catches the irony of Kashmir's physical beauty, the claustrophobia of militarisation, the dread and hopelessness of children born into war and the nuances of relationships. It also filters the inherent joie-de-vivre of youth, even if that flows uneasily with Kashmir's collective memory of unmitigated grief ... There is no better way to understand Kashmir right now.'. The film was shot by Kumar himself using five different camera formats "There is a rough, almost unpolished, feel to Inshallah, Football. The narrative runs unfettered, with an energy of its own." says Tehelka, "We shot with five different cameras, from DSLRs to the best equipment. The idea was to watch life unfold and get under the skin of the audience." adds Kumar.

Plot summary 

Inshallah, Football is about 18-year-old Basharat Baba, known as "Basha". His father, Bashir, was a much-wanted leader of the armed group Hizbul Mujahideen. When he left his home in Kashmir to join the training camps in Pakistan in the early 1990s, his son Basharat was barely two months old.

Basharat belongs to a new generation of Kashmiris, having grown up under the shadow of a protracted conflict. His passion is football, and he has been coached by Juan Marcos Troia, an Argentinean national and FIFA accredited football coach by profession. Marcos aspires to breed world class players from Kashmir; he and his wife, being attached to both Basha and Kashmir, migrate to Srinagar with their three daughters to take up Basha's cause.

Marcos runs a football academy called International Sports Academy Trust; and an exchange program for his most talented players to train at Santos FC, Pele's old club in Brazil. Basharat was one of chosen few, but was denied a passport by the Government of India. The passport in question did come through after Jammu and Kashmir Chief Minister Omar Abdullah intervened.

Inshallah, Football tells this story through Bashir's recollections and travails. Kumar describes the film as "the story of three remarkable men – one is his father who fought for his beliefs, another about the football coach who's come all the way from Argentina to start this football academy, and this young man who is struggling to play football."

The film has been critically acclaimed and played in competition part of the wide-angle documentary section at the Pusan Film Festival where it also received the Asian Network of Documentary (AND) Fund, and winner of Muhr AsiaAfrica / Documentary /Special Mention : Ashvin Kumar (director) at the Dubai International Film Festival

Censorship controversy 

This film has face considerable difficulties in getting the necessary censor certificate, without which it cannot be shown publicly in India.  The main stumbling block appears to be the content of the film itself, since it deals with the sensitive and highly political subject of how the Indian armed forces have conducted themselves in Kashmir.

The series and timing of events by which this film's review by the censor has proceeded is unusual, and suggestive of political considerations playing a part in the award of a censor's certificate:
 On 28 October 2010, Pankaja Thakur (CEO of the New Delhi office of censor board) reviewed the film and cleared it for a single private screening.  An initial review by a senior censor official would normally indicate that the remainder of the certification process is a formality.
 A review committee in Mumbai, where the film's application for censor certification had been made, subsequently rejected the application altogether.
 A second review committee confirmed the ban. As reported in The Hindu newspaper, sources from India's Ministry of Information & Broadcasting noted that "the problem with the CBFC's committees is that many of the nominated members are either related to government officials like police officers or have a conservative outlook.". Normally, filmmakers are invited to present their case for gaining certification at such reviews, but Kumar and his colleagues were not invited.
 However, Sharmila Tagore, the well-known Indian actress and current chairperson of the Censor Board pressed for a third review.  This review was handled in a way that clearly put Kumar at a disadvantage: Kumar received an email from the censor board on 28 December, while in Mumbai, informing him that the review would take place the very next day in New Delhi – 800 miles away.  This unexpected shift in venue, and hurried timing of the notification, may have been designed to ensure that Kumar would not be able to present his case directly before the review committee.  Following this review, the Censor Board awarded the film an "Adult" ("A") certificate.

The award of an "Adult" certificate for a documentary is very unusual, since an Adult certificate is normally awarded to feature films that include graphic violence and nudity.  Such films can be shown only to audiences over the age of 18, and most movie theatres in India will not ordinarily agree to screen such films since it is very difficult to for them to make money in the circumstances.  (This is not the case, however, with India's burgeoning soft-porn industry, which relies upon the "A" certificates to attracts its particular audience.)

The explanation for awarding Inshallah, Football was that the film has "characters talking about graphic details of physical and mental torture they had to undergo.  The theme of the film is mature and some dialogues can be psychologically damaging for non-adult audience."  Kumar, however, asserts that the real purpose of this censorship is to avoid causing embarrassment to the Indian government, with regard to the conduct of the Indian armed forces in Kashmir.

Mrs. Tagore made further comments on the 16th anniversary of the women's press corps that were reported by the online version of Outlook Magazine to which Kumar has responded in an open letter to Mrs. Tagore taking on the wider issue of censorship, the relevance of the censor board using Inshallah, Football as an illustration saying that her comments "...would be mildly amusing if they didn't also cast a shadow on the average Indian citizen's freedoms to produce and receive messages, and if they didn't potentially compromise the livelihood of members of my (and your) fraternity–those troublesome film-makers who don't toe the line and whose discomfiting messages the nation needs to hear." A separate report of Mrs. Tagore's comments is more direct, calling Kumar's comments 'untrue'. Kumar has responded to this in the aforementioned open letter saying "You said that my statement about being denied a certification for my film Inshallah, Football was 'untrue'. I was hurt; after all, it is not often that I am called a liar in public." Mrs. Tagore has also said in the same interview that Inshallah, Football "(is) a beautiful film and I want everyone to see it," but Kumar counters, "Let me speak plainly. I think you have been used to stamp a sense of 'reasonableness' on the sordid affair of restricting freedom of speech. The decisions of the body you head need to be, or need to be seen to be, more moral, more conservative, more risk-averse, more politically correct and more circumspect (thus, in common parlance, more anal-retentive) than is natural or necessary, even if basic principles of natural justice need to be given a go-by from time to time.". The same open letter also appears on Kumar's blog where it has attracted a fair share of attention by way of adverse comments not only concerning censorship but the Kashmir issue as well

The timing of this award of an Adult certificate to Inshallah, Football is curious, since it coincided with the award of an Adult certificate for a No One Killed Jessica, a film based upon the murder of Jessica Lall by Manu Sharma, a wealthy man with strong political ties to the ruling Indian National Congress.  In both cases, there is an appearance of the Indian censor board having taken political considerations into account in their award of Adult certificates. Kumar says that he will now appeal to the CBFC tribunal

Inshallah Kashmir 

Kumar's latest film on Kashmir, Inshallah Kashmir is the story of contemporary Kashmir. A series of counterpointed testimonies, the heartbreaking coming-of-age of ordinary people; warped and brutalised by two decades of militancy and its terrible response. Tehelka says, "Although the camera and narrator usually provide the impartial eye in a documentary, stitching the story together, in Inshallah, Kashmir it is the Kashmiris who weave their deadpan narrative into a cohesive picture. Their matter-of-fact monotone says more than an entire valley of screams could." The film won Kumar his second National Award, this time for Best Investigative Film.

Plot summary 

Inshallah Kashmir opens with ex-militants describing the torture they underwent when captured by the army. A Hindu describes his sentiment on being a part of the minority in the region at the height of militancy, when his grandfather was shot dead by militants. A politician and her husband describe the horror of being kidnapped and in captivity for over a month – and despite that, forming a human bond with the militants, and helping them escape when the army closed in on them. One understands from this section that militancy was not binary in nature. It was a dynamic and complex, resulting from various socio-political, economic and religious issues.

Disappearances and fake encounters led to the creation of mass graves, hidden away in sensitive border areas that civilians and journalists are not permitted to access in the name of national security. Human rights lawyer and activist Parvez Imroz reveals to us the presence of almost a thousand such graves in the valley. Rape victims from Kunan Poshpora describe the trauma they went through at the hands of the army and the stigma that they still face due to the incident.

The film then leads us to 'normalcy' or the social ramifications the last twenty years of devastation brought to the valley. Militancy in Kashmir resulted in the Government of India deploying tens of thousands of armed troops in the region. We hear the story of one boy who lost his leg because he was caught in crossfire. The film ends on a poignant note with a young artist saying 'I need my space.'

Online release 

On 18 January, Alipur Films uploaded the first seven minutes of the film Inshallah Kashmir : Living Terror online. Social networking sites like Facebook and Twitter picked it up and the link had over a ten thousand hits in a week and generated curiosity and contempt alike. Views had crossed over fifty thousand within a week.

The idea of releasing Inshallah Kashmir online and free of charge was to take the film to the masses, and to make it accessible to as many people as possible – in Kashmir, within India and around the world. The full film went online on 26 January 2012, on the Indian Republic day and had over almost fifteen thousand hits that day. Since then, the film has been screened at festivals around the world.

The film has been given the 'A' certificate by the Central Board of Film Certification.

Filmography
Road to Ladakh (2003)
Little Terrorist (short film, 2004)
The Forest (2009)
Inshallah, Football (2009)
Dazed in Doon (2010)
Inshallah, Kashmir (2012)
I Am Not Here (2015)
No Fathers in Kashmir (2019)

Awards

References

External links

Indian documentary filmmakers
Film directors from Kolkata
Film producers from Kolkata
Indian documentary film editors
The Doon School alumni
Living people
Censorship in India
1973 births
21st-century Indian film directors
Film editors from West Bengal